Daudawa is a Fulani  community in Faskari Local Government Area, Katsina State, Nigeria.
The average elevation above sea level is 634 meters.

Daudawa is the birthplace of Nasir Ahmad el-Rufai, Minister of the Federal Capital Territory (FCT) of Abuja from 2003 to 2007 and Incumbent Governor of Kaduna State.

References

Populated places in Katsina State